The 1816–17 United States House of Representatives elections were held on various dates in various states between April 30, 1816 and August 14, 1817. Each state set its own date for its elections to the House of Representatives before the first session of the 15th United States Congress convened on December 1, 1817. The size of the House increased to 184 after Indiana and Mississippi achieved statehood.

The Democratic-Republican Party entered the election with a large majority, yet made sizable gains, helping trigger the virtually nonpartisan Era of Good Feelings under new President James Monroe, elected in 1816.

Two major events combined to help eliminate the declining Federalist Party from meaningful contention. First, the War of 1812 had concluded in 1815 with a feeling of national pride and relief, with the small American military fighting the much more powerful British forces to a draw punctuated by General Andrew Jackson's dramatic victory at the Battle of New Orleans. Federalists had opposed the risky but ultimately successful war, with some New England Federalists advocating radical measures at the Hartford Convention. Second, the 1815 eruption of Mount Tambora in present-day Indonesia, itself the most powerful in recorded history and following other major eruptions, temporarily disrupted global climate. The effects severely damaged the agricultural economy of New England, where Federalist support was strongest, causing privation, popular discontent, and mass emigration westward.

Election summaries 
Mississippi was admitted as a state in 1817 during the 15th Congress, adding one seat.

Special elections 

There were special elections in 1816 and 1817 to the 14th United States Congress and 15th United States Congress.

Special elections are sorted by date then district.

14th Congress 

|-
! 
| Nathaniel Macon
|  | Democratic-Republican
| 1791
|  | Incumbent resigned December 15, 1815 when elected U.S. Senator.New member elected January 22, 1816.Democratic-Republican hold.Successor seated February 7, 1816.Winner was later re-elected to the next term, see below.
| nowrap | 

|-
! (Seat A)
| Nicholas R. Moore
|  | Democratic-Republican
| 18031810 1812
|  | Incumbent resigned in 1815.New member elected January 27, 1816.Democratic-Republican hold.Successor seated February 4, 1816.Successor was later re-elected to the next term, see below.
| nowrap | 

|-
! 
| Peter B. Porter
|  | Democratic-Republican
| 18081812 1814
|  | Incumbent resigned January 23, 1816New member elected April 30 – May 2, 1816.Democratic-Republican hold.Successor seated December 2, 1816.Winner was not elected to the next term, see below.
| nowrap | 

|-
! 
| William R. King
|  | Democratic-Republican
| 1810
|  | Incumbent resigned, effective November 4, 1816.New member elected before August 16, 1816.Democratic-Republican hold.Successor seated December 2, 1816.Winner later lost re-election to the next term, see below.
| nowrap | 

|-
! 
| Richard Stanford
|  | Democratic-Republican
| 1796
|  | Incumbent died April 16, 1816.New member elected before August 22, 1816.Democratic-Republican hold.Successor seated December 2, 1816.Winner later lost re-election to the next term, see below.
| nowrap | 

|-
! 
| Enos T. Throop
|  | Democratic-Republican
| 1814
|  | Incumbent resigned June 4, 1816 after losing re-election.New member elected August 27–29, 1816.Democratic-Republican hold.Successor seated December 3, 1816.Winner was not elected to the next term, see below.
| nowrap | 

|-
! (Seat B)
| William Pinkney
|  | Democratic-Republican
| 17901791 1814
|  | Incumbent resigned April 18, 1816 to become Minister to Russia.New member elected September 3, 1816.Democratic-Republican hold.Successor seated December 2, 1816.Successor was later re-elected to the next term, see below.
| nowrap | 

|-
! 
| Alexander C. Hanson
|  | Federalist
| 1812
|  | Incumbent resigned after being elected to the Senate.New member elected October 6, 1816.Federalist-Republican hold.Successor seated December 2, 1816.Successor also elected the same day to the next term, see below.
| nowrap | 

|-
! 
| John McLean
|  | Democratic-Republican
| 1812
|  | Incumbent resigned in April 1816 after being appointed to the Supreme Court of Ohio.New member elected October 8, 1816.Democratic-Republican hold.Successor seated December 2, 1816.Winner also elected, the same day, to the next term, see below.
| nowrap | 

|-
! 
| Thomas Burnside
|  | Democratic-Republican
| 1815 
|  | Incumbent resigned in April 1816 to accept judicial appointment.New member elected October 8, 1816.Democratic-Republican hold.Successor seated December 3, 1816.Successor also elected, the same day, to the next term, see below.
| nowrap | 

|-
! 
| Thomas Gholson Jr.
|  | Democratic-Republican
| 1808 
|  | Incumbent died July 4, 1816.New member elected October 10–28, 1816.Democratic-Republican hold.Successor seated December 4, 1816.
| nowrap | 

|-
! 
| William Mayrant
|  | Democratic-Republican
| 1814
|  | Incumbent resigned October 21, 1816, having just lost re-election.New member elected November 25 & 26, 1816, who had also won the general election, see below.Democratic-Republican hold.Successor seated January 2, 1817.
| nowrap | 

|-
! 
| Alfred Cuthbert
|  | Democratic-Republican
| 1813 1814
|  | Incumbent resigned November 9, 1816.New member elected December 1816.Democratic-Republican hold.Successor seated January 23, 1817.
| nowrap | 

|-
! 
| James Clark
|  | Democratic-Republican
| 1812
|  | Incumbent resigned April 8, 1816 when appointed circuit court judge.New member elected in 1816.Democratic-Republican hold.Successor seated December 2, 1816.Successor was not elected to the next term, see below.
| nowrap | 

|-
! 
| Elijah Brigham
|  | Federalist
| 1810
|  | Incumbent died February 22, 1816.New member elected in 1816.Federalist-Republican hold.Successor seated December 2, 1816.
| nowrap | 

|-
! 
| John Clopton
|  | Democratic-Republican
| 17951799 1801
|  | Incumbent died September 11, 1816New member elected in 1816.Democratic-Republican hold.Successor seated December 17, 1816.
| nowrap | 

|}

15th Congress 

|-
! 
| David Scott
|  | Democratic-Republican
| 1816
| Incumbent resigned to become president and judge of the court of common pleas.New member elected October 14, 1817.Democratic-Republican hold.Successor seated with the rest of the House December 1, 1817.
| nowrap | 

|-
! rowspan=2 | 2 seats on a general ticket
| Sylvanus Backus
|  | Federalist
| 1816
|  | Member-elect died February 15, 1817.New member elected in 1817.Federalist hold.Successor seated with the rest of the House December 1, 1817.
| rowspan=2 nowrap | 

|-
| Charles Dennison
|  | Federalist
| 1816
|  | Member-elect declined the seat.New member elected in 1817.Federalist hold.Successor seated with the rest of the House December 1, 1817.

|-
! 
| Henry B. Lee
|  | Democratic-Republican
| 1816
|  | Member-elect died February 18, 1817.New member elected in 1817.Democratic-Republican hold.Successor seated with the rest of the House December 1, 1817.
| nowrap | 

|-
! 
| John Scott
|  | Democratic-Republican
| 1816
| Incumbent's re-election declared illegal and seat vacated since March 4, 1817.Incumbent re-elected in 1817.Successor seated August 4, 1817.
| nowrap | 

|}

Connecticut 

Connecticut elected its members September 16, 1816.

|-
! rowspan=7 | 
| Benjamin Tallmadge
|  | Federalist
| 1801 
|  | Incumbent retired.New member elected.Federalist hold.Successor (Backus) died February 15, 1817, leading to a special election.
| rowspan=7 nowrap | 

|-
| Epaphroditus Champion
|  | Federalist
| 1806
|  | Incumbent lost-relection.New member elected.Federalist hold.

|-
| Lewis B. Sturges
|  | Federalist
| 1805 
|  | Incumbent lost-re-election.New member elected.Federalist hold.Successor (Dennison) declined to serve, leading to a special election.

|-
| Timothy Pitkin
|  | Federalist
| 1805 
| Incumbent re-elected.

|-
| John Davenport
|  | Federalist
| 1798
|  | Incumbent retired.New member elected.Federalist hold.

|-
| Jonathan O. Moseley
|  | Federalist
| 1804
| Incumbent re-elected.

|-
| Lyman Law
|  | Federalist
| 1810
|  | Incumbent lost-relection.New member elected.Federalist hold.

|}

Delaware 

Delaware elected its members October 7, 1816.

|-
! rowspan=2 | 
| Thomas Clayton
|  | Federalist
| 1814
|  | Incumbent lost-relection.New member elected.Federalist hold.
| rowspan=2 nowrap | 

|-
| Thomas Cooper
|  | Federalist
| 1812
|  | Incumbent lost-relection.New member elected.Democratic-Republican gain.

|}

Georgia 

Georgia elected its members October 7, 1816.

|-
! rowspan=6 | 
| Wilson Lumpkin
|  | Democratic-Republican
| 1814
|  | Incumbent lost-relection.New member elected.Democratic-Republican hold.
| rowspan=6 nowrap | 

|-
| Richard Henry Wilde
|  | Democratic-Republican
| 1814
|  | Incumbent lost-relection.New member elected.Democratic-Republican hold.

|-
| Bolling Hall
|  | Democratic-Republican
| 1810
|  | Incumbent retired.New member elected.Democratic-Republican hold.

|-
| Zadock Cook
|  | Democratic-Republican
| 1816 
| Incumbent re-elected.

|-
| Thomas Telfair
|  | Democratic-Republican
| 1812
|  | Incumbent lost-relection.New member elected.Democratic-Republican hold.

|-
| John Forsyth
|  | Democratic-Republican
| 1812
| Incumbent re-elected.

|}

Illinois Territory 
See Non-voting delegates, below.

Indiana 

Indiana elected its member August 4, 1817, having just elected him just the year before to the new seat.

14th Congress 

|-
! 
| colspan=3 | None (District created)
|  | Indiana was admitted as a state of the Union on December 11, 1816.New member elected in 1816.Democratic-Republican gain.New member seated December 11, 1816.
| nowrap | 

|}

15th Congress 

|-
! 
| William Hendricks
|  | Democratic-Republican
| 1816
| Incumbent re-elected.
| nowrap | 

|}

Kentucky 

Kentucky elected its members August 5, 1816.

|-
! 
| James Clark
|  | Democratic-Republican
| 1812
|  | Incumbent resigned April 8, 1816 when appointed circuit court judge.New member elected.Democratic-Republican hold.Successor was not elected to finish the current term.
| nowrap | 

|-
! 
| Henry Clay
|  | Democratic-Republican
| 18101814 18141815 (Seat declared vacant)1815 
| Incumbent re-elected.
| nowrap | 

|-
! 
| Richard M. Johnson
|  | Democratic-Republican
| 1806
| Incumbent re-elected.
| nowrap | 

|-
! 
| Joseph Desha
|  | Democratic-Republican
| 1806
| Incumbent re-elected.
| nowrap | 

|-
! 
| Alney McLean
|  | Democratic-Republican
| 1814
|  | Incumbent retired.New member elected.Democratic-Republican hold.
| nowrap | 

|-
! 
| Solomon P. Sharp
|  | Democratic-Republican
| 1812
|  | Incumbent lost-relection.New member elected.Democratic-Republican hold.
| nowrap | 

|-
! 
| Samuel McKee
|  | Democratic-Republican
| 1808
|  | Incumbent retired.New member elected.Democratic-Republican hold.
| nowrap | 

|-
! 
| Stephen Ormsby
|  | Democratic-Republican
| 18101812 1813 
|  | Incumbent lost-relection.New member elected.Democratic-Republican hold.
| nowrap | 

|-
! 
| Micah Taul
|  | Democratic-Republican
| 1814
|  | Incumbent retired.New member elected.Democratic-Republican hold.
| nowrap | 

|-
! 
| Benjamin Hardin
|  | Democratic-Republican
| 1814
|  | Incumbent retired.New member elected.Democratic-Republican hold.
| nowrap | 

|}

Louisiana 

Louisiana elected its members July 1–3, 1816.

|-
! 
| Thomas B. Robertson
|  | Democratic-Republican
| 1812
| Incumbent re-elected.
| nowrap | 

|}

Maryland 

Maryland elected its members October 6, 1816.

|-
! 
| Philip Stuart
|  | Federalist
| 1810
| Incumbent re-elected.
| nowrap | 

|-
! 
| John C. Herbert
|  | Federalist
| 1814
| Incumbent re-elected.
| nowrap | 

|-
! 
| Alexander C. Hanson
|  | Federalist
| 1812
|  | Incumbent resigned in 1816 when elected U.S. Senator.Winner was also elected to finish the term, see above.Federalist hold.
| nowrap | 

|-
! 
| George Baer Jr.
|  | Federalist
| 17961801 1814
|  | Incumbent retired.New member elected.Democratic-Republican gain.
| nowrap | 

|-
! rowspan=2 | 
| Samuel Smith
|  | Democratic-Republican
| 17921802 1816 
| Incumbent re-elected.
| rowspan=2 nowrap | 

|-
| Peter Little
|  | Democratic-Republican
| 1816 
| Incumbent re-elected.

|-
! 
| Stevenson Archer
|  | Democratic-Republican
| 1811 
|  | Incumbent lost-relection.New member elected.Democratic-Republican hold.
| nowrap | 

|-
! 
| Robert Wright
|  | Democratic-Republican
| 1810 
|  | Incumbent retired.New member elected.Democratic-Republican hold.
| nowrap | 

|-
! 
| Charles Goldsborough
|  | Federalist
| 1804
|  | Incumbent retired.New member elected.Federalist hold.
| nowrap | 

|}

Massachusetts 

Massachusetts's electoral law required a majority for election. In five districts this was not met on the first election, requiring additional trials to be held.

Massachusetts elected its members November 4, 1816.

District numbers differed between source used and elsewhere on Wikipedia; district numbers used elsewhere on Wikipedia used here.

|-
! 
| Artemas Ward Jr.
|  | Federalist
| 1812
|  | Incumbent retired.New member elected.Federalist hold.Winner declined to serve and was replaced in a special election.
| nowrap | 

|-
! 
| Timothy Pickering
|  | Federalist
| 1812
|  | Incumbent retired.New member elected.Democratic-Republican gain.
| nowrap | 

|-
! 
| Jeremiah Nelson
|  | Federalist
| 18041806 1814
| Incumbent re-elected.
| : : : 

|-
! 
| Asahel Stearns
|  | Federalist
| 1814
|  | Incumbent lost-relection.New member elected.Democratic-Republican gain.
| nowrap | 

|-
! 
| Elijah H. Mills
|  | Federalist
| 1814
| Incumbent re-elected.
| nowrap | 

|-
! 
| Samuel Taggart
|  | Federalist
| 1803
|  | Incumbent retired.New member elected.Federalist hold.
| nowrap | 

|-
! 
| John W. Hulbert
|  | Federalist
| 1812
|  | Incumbent retired.New member elected.Democratic-Republican gain.
| nowrap | 

|-
! 
| William Baylies
|  | Federalist
| 1812
|  | Incumbent retired.New member elected.Democratic-Republican gain.
| : : 

|-
! 
| John Reed Jr.
|  | Federalist
| 1812
|  | Incumbent lost-relection.New member elected.Democratic-Republican gain.
| : : : 

|-
! 
| Laban Wheaton
|  | Federalist
| 1808
|  | Incumbent retired.New member elected.Democratic-Republican gain.
| nowrap | 

|-
! 
| Elijah Brigham
|  | Federalist
| 1810
|  | Incumbent retired.New member elected.Federalist hold.
| nowrap | 

|-
! 
| Solomon Strong
|  | Federalist
| 1814
| Incumbent re-elected.
| nowrap | 

|-
! 
| Nathaniel Ruggles
|  | Federalist
| 1812
| Incumbent re-elected.
| nowrap | 

|-
! 
| Cyrus King
|  | Federalist
| 1812
|  | Incumbent lost-relection.New member elected.Democratic-Republican gain.
| nowrap | 

|-
! 
| George Bradbury
|  | Federalist
| 1812
|  | Incumbent retired.New member elected.Federalist hold.
| nowrap | 

|-
! 
| Benjamin Brown
|  | Federalist
| 1812
|  | Ran for re-election in the 18th districtFederalist hold.
| nowrap | 

|-
! 
| James Carr
|  | Democratic-Republican
| 1815
|  | Incumbent retired.New member elected.Federalist gain.
| nowrap | 

|-
! rowspan=2 | 
| Thomas Rice
|  | Federalist
| 1814
| Incumbent re-elected.
| nowrap rowspan=2 | : : : : : : 
|-
| Samuel S. Conner
|  | Democratic-Republican
| 1815
|  | Incumbent lost re-election.Democratic-Republican loss.

|-
! 
| colspan=3 | Vacant
|  | Incumbent ran in the .New member elected.Democratic-Republican gain.
| : : : : : 

|-
! 
| Albion K. Parris
|  | Democratic-Republican
| 1814
| Incumbent re-elected.
| nowrap | 

|}

Mississippi 

Mississippi was admitted as a state on December 10, 1817 from the western half of the former Mississippi Territory (the eastern half became Alabama Territory) It elected its first representative to Congress August 4–5, 1817.

|-
! 
| colspan=3 | None (District created)
|  | New seat.New member elected.Democratic-Republican gain.
| nowrap | 

|}

Missouri Territory 
See Non-voting delegates, below.

New Hampshire 

New Hampshire elected its members August 26, 1816.

|-
! rowspan=6 | 
| Bradbury Cilley
|  | Federalist
| 1812
|  | Incumbent lost-relection.New member elected.Democratic-Republican gain.
| rowspan=6 nowrap | 

|-
| Charles Humphrey Atherton
|  | Federalist
| 1814
|  | Incumbent retired.New member elected.Democratic-Republican gain.

|-
| William Hale
|  | Federalist
| 18081810 1812
|  | Incumbent lost-relection.New member elected.Democratic-Republican gain.

|-
| Roger Vose
|  | Federalist
| 1812
|  | Incumbent lost-relection.New member elected.Democratic-Republican gain.

|-
| Daniel Webster
|  | Federalist
| 1812
|  | Incumbent retired.New member elected.Democratic-Republican gain.

|-
| Jeduthun Wilcox
|  | Federalist
| 1812
|  | Incumbent lost-relection.New member elected.Democratic-Republican gain.

|}

New Jersey 

In 1816, the Democratic-Republican candidates ran unopposed.

New Jersey elected its members November 4–5, 1816.

|-
! rowspan=6 | 
| Lewis Condict
|  | Democratic-Republican
| 1810
|  | Incumbent retired.New member elected.Democratic-Republican hold.
| rowspan=6 nowrap | 

|-
| Thomas Ward
|  | Democratic-Republican
| 1813
|  | Incumbent retired.New member elected.Democratic-Republican hold.

|-
| Henry Southard
|  | Democratic-Republican
| 1814
| Incumbent re-elected.

|-
| Ephraim Bateman
|  | Democratic-Republican
| 1814
| Incumbent re-elected.

|-
| Ezra Baker
|  | Democratic-Republican
| 1814
|  | Incumbent retired.New member elected.Democratic-Republican hold.

|-
| Benjamin Bennet
|  | Democratic-Republican
| 1814
| Incumbent re-elected.

|}

New York 

New York elected its members April 23 to 25, 1816.

|-
! rowspan=2 | 
| George Townsend
|  | Democratic-Republican
| 1814
| Incumbent re-elected.
| rowspan=2 nowrap | 
|-
| Henry Crocheron
|  | Democratic-Republican
| 1814
|  | Incumbent retired.New member elected.Democratic-Republican hold.

|-
! rowspan=2 | 
| William Irving
|  | Democratic-Republican
| 1813 
| Incumbent re-elected.
| rowspan=2 nowrap | 
|-
| Peter H. Wendover
|  | Democratic-Republican
| 1814
| Incumbent re-elected.

|-
! 
| Jonathan Ward
|  | Democratic-Republican
| 1814
|  | Incumbent retired.New member elected.Democratic-Republican hold.
| nowrap | 

|-
! 
| Abraham H. Schenck
|  | Democratic-Republican
| 1814
|  | Incumbent retired.New member elected.Democratic-Republican hold.Winner died February 18, 1817, leading to a special election.
| nowrap | 

|-
! 
| Thomas P. Grosvenor
|  | Federalist
| 1812
|  | Incumbent retired.New member elected.Federalist hold.
| nowrap | 

|-
! 
| James W. Wilkin
|  | Democratic-Republican
| 1815 
| Incumbent re-elected.
| nowrap | 

|-
! 
| Samuel Betts
|  | Democratic-Republican
| 1814
|  | Incumbent retired.New member elected.Democratic-Republican hold.
| nowrap | 

|-
! 
| Erastus Root
|  | Democratic-Republican
| 18021804 18081810 1815 (Won contest)
|  | Incumbent retired.New member elected.Democratic-Republican hold.
| nowrap | 

|-
! 
| John Lovett
|  | Federalist
| 1812
|  | Incumbent lost-relection.New member elected.Federalist hold.
| nowrap | 

|-
! 
| Hosea Moffitt
|  | Federalist
| 1812
|  | Incumbent retired.New member elected.Federalist hold.
| nowrap | 

|-
! 
| John W. Taylor
|  | Democratic-Republican
| 1812
| Incumbent re-elected.
| nowrap | 

|-
! rowspan=2 | 
| John Savage
|  | Democratic-Republican
| 1814
| Incumbent re-elected.
| rowspan=2 nowrap | 
|-
| Asa Adgate
|  | Democratic-Republican
| 1815 
|  | Incumbent retired.New member elected.Democratic-Republican hold.

|-
! 
| John B. Yates
|  | Democratic-Republican
| 1814
|  | Incumbent retired.New member elected.Democratic-Republican hold.
| nowrap | 

|-
! 
| Daniel Cady
|  | Federalist
| 1814
|  | Incumbent retired.New member elected.Democratic-Republican gain.
| nowrap | 

|-
! rowspan=2 | 
| Jabez D. Hammond
|  | Democratic-Republican
| 1814
|  | Incumbent retired.New member elected.Democratic-Republican hold.
| rowspan=2 nowrap | 
|-
| James Birdsall
|  | Democratic-Republican
| 1814
|  | Incumbent retired.New member elected.Democratic-Republican hold.

|-
! 
| Thomas R. Gold
|  | Federalist
| 18081814
|  | Incumbent retired.New member elected.Federalist hold.
| nowrap | 

|-
! 
| Westel Willoughby Jr.
|  | Federalist
| 1814
|  | Incumbent retired.New member elected.Democratic-Republican gain.
| nowrap | 

|-
! 
| Moss Kent
|  | Federalist
| 1812
|  | Incumbent retired.New member elected.Federalist hold.
| nowrap | 

|-
! 
| Victory Birdseye
|  | Democratic-Republican
| 1814
|  | Incumbent retired.New member elected.Democratic-Republican hold.
| nowrap | 

|-
! rowspan=2 | 
| Enos T. Throop
|  | Democratic-Republican
| 1814
|  | Incumbent lost-relection.New member elected.Democratic-Republican hold.Incumbent then resigned June 4, 1816, leading to a special election.
| rowspan=2 nowrap | 
|-
| Oliver C. Comstock
|  | Democratic-Republican
| 1812
| Incumbent re-elected.

|-
! rowspan=2 | 
| Micah Brooks
|  | Democratic-Republican
| 1814
|  | Incumbent lost-relection.New member elected.Democratic-Republican hold.
| rowspan=2 nowrap | 
|-
| Peter B. Porter
|  | Democratic-Republican
| 18081812 1814
|  | Incumbent resigned January 23, 1816 to become Commissioner under the Treaty of Ghent.New member elected.Democratic-Republican hold.Winner was not elected to finish the term, see above.

|}

North Carolina 

North Carolina elected its members August 14, 1817.

|-
! 
| William H. Murfree
|  | Democratic-Republican
| 1813
|  | Incumbent retired.New member elected.Democratic-Republican hold.
| nowrap | 

|-
! 
| Joseph H. Bryan
|  | Democratic-Republican
| 1815
| Incumbent re-elected.
| nowrap | 

|-
! 
| James W. Clark
|  | Democratic-Republican
| 1815
|  | Incumbent retired.New member elected.Democratic-Republican hold.
| nowrap | 

|-
! 
| William Gaston
|  | Federalist
| 1813
|  | Incumbent retired.New member elected.Federalist hold.
| nowrap | 

|-
! 
| Charles Hooks
|  | Democratic-Republican
| 1816 
|  | Incumbent lost-relection.New member elected.Democratic-Republican hold.
| nowrap | 

|-
! 
| Weldon N. Edwards
|  | Democratic-Republican
| 1816 
| Incumbent re-elected.
| nowrap | 

|-
! 
| John Culpepper
|  | Federalist
| 18061808 (Contested election)1808 1813
|  | Incumbent lost-relection.New member elected.Federalist hold.Successor died before being seated, leading to a special election.
| nowrap | 

|-
! 
| Samuel Dickens
|  | Democratic-Republican
| 1816 
|  | Incumbent lost-relection.New member elected.Democratic-Republican hold.
| nowrap | 

|-
! 
| Bartlett Yancey
|  | Democratic-Republican
| 1813
|  | Incumbent retired.New member elected.Democratic-Republican hold.
| nowrap | 

|-
! 
| William C. Love
|  | Democratic-Republican
| 1815
|  | Incumbent retired.New member elected.Democratic-Republican hold.
| nowrap | 

|-
! 
| Daniel M. Forney
|  | Democratic-Republican
| 1815
| Incumbent re-elected.
| nowrap | 

|-
! 
| Israel Pickens
|  | Democratic-Republican
| 1810
|  | Incumbent retired.New member elected.Democratic-Republican hold.
| nowrap | 

|-
! 
| Lewis Williams
|  | Democratic-Republican
| 1815
| Incumbent re-elected.
| nowrap | 

|}

Ohio 

Ohio elected its members October 8, 1816.

|-
! 
| John McLean
|  | Democratic-Republican
| 1812
|  | Incumbent resigned in April 1816 become Associate Judge of Ohio Supreme Court.New member elected.Democratic-Republican hold.Winner also elected, the same day, to finish the current next term.
| nowrap | 

|-
! 
| John Alexander
|  | Democratic-Republican
| 1812
|  | Incumbent lost-relection.New member elected.Democratic-Republican hold.
| nowrap | 

|-
! 
| William Creighton Jr.
|  | Democratic-Republican
| 1813 
|  | Incumbent retired.New member elected.Democratic-Republican hold.
| nowrap | 

|-
! 
| James Caldwell
|  | Democratic-Republican
| 1812
|  | Incumbent retired.New member elected.Democratic-Republican hold.Election was later unsuccessfully contested.
| nowrap | 

|-
! 
| James Kilbourne
|  | Democratic-Republican
| 1812
|  | Incumbent retired.New member elected.Federalist gain.
| nowrap | 

|-
! 
| David Clendenin
|  | Democratic-Republican
| 1814
|  | Incumbent lost-relection.New member elected.Democratic-Republican hold.
| nowrap | 

|}

Pennsylvania 

Pennsylvania elected its members October 8, 1816.

|-
! rowspan=4 | 
| John Sergeant
|  | Federalist
| 1815 
| Incumbent re-elected.
| rowspan=4 nowrap | 
|-
| Joseph Hopkinson
|  | Federalist
| 1814
| Incumbent re-elected.
|-
| William Milnor
|  | Federalist
| 18061810 1814
|  | Incumbent lost-relection.New member elected.Democratic-Republican gain.
|-
| Thomas Smith
|  | Federalist
| 1814
|  | Incumbent retired.New member elected.Democratic-Republican gain.

|-
! rowspan=2 | 
| William Darlington
|  | Democratic-Republican
| 1814
|  | Incumbent lost-relection.New member elected.Federalist gain.
| rowspan=2 nowrap | 
|-
| John Hahn
|  | Democratic-Republican
| 1814
|  | Incumbent lost-relection.New member elected.Federalist gain.

|-
! rowspan=2 | 
| John Whiteside
|  | Democratic-Republican
| 1814
| Incumbent re-elected.
| rowspan=2 nowrap | 
|-
| James M. Wallace
|  | Democratic-Republican
| 1815 
| Incumbent re-elected.

|-
! 
| Hugh Glasgow
|  | Democratic-Republican
| 1812
|  | Incumbent retired.New member elected.Democratic-Republican hold.
| nowrap | 

|-
! rowspan=2 | 
| William Maclay
|  | Democratic-Republican
| 1814
| Incumbent re-elected.
| rowspan=2 nowrap | 
|-
| William Crawford
|  | Democratic-Republican
| 1808
|  | Incumbent lost-relection.New member elected.Democratic-Republican hold.

|-
! rowspan=2 | 
| Samuel D. Ingham
|  | Democratic-Republican
| 1812
| Incumbent re-elected.
| rowspan=2 nowrap | 
|-
| John Ross
|  | Democratic-Republican
| 1814
| Incumbent re-elected.

|-
! 
| Joseph Hiester
|  | Democratic-Republican
| 17981804 1814
| Incumbent re-elected.
| nowrap | 

|-
! 
| William Piper
|  | Democratic-Republican
| 1810
|  | Incumbent retired.New member elected.Democratic-Republican hold.
| nowrap | 

|-
! 
| Thomas Burnside
|  | Democratic-Republican
| 1815 
|  | Incumbent resigned in April 1816 to accept judicial appointment.New member elected October 8, 1816.Democratic-Republican hold.Successor also elected, the same day, to finish the term.
| nowrap | 
|-
! rowspan=2 | 
| William Wilson
|  | Democratic-Republican
| 1814
| Incumbent re-elected.
| rowspan=2 nowrap | 
|-
| Jared Irwin
|  | Democratic-Republican
| 1812
|  | Incumbent retired.New member elected.Democratic-Republican hold.Successor resigned before Congress started, leading to a special election.

|-
! 
| William Findley
|  | Democratic-Republican
| 1802
|  | Incumbent retired.New member elected.Democratic-Republican hold.
| nowrap | 

|-
! 
| Aaron Lyle
|  | Democratic-Republican
| 1808
|  | Incumbent retired.New member elected.Democratic-Republican hold.
| nowrap | 

|-
! 
| Isaac Griffin
|  | Democratic-Republican
| 1813 
|  | Incumbent retired.New member elected.Democratic-Republican hold.
| nowrap | 

|-
! 
| John Woods
|  | Federalist
| 1814
|  | Incumbent retired.New member elected.Democratic-Republican gain.
| nowrap | 

|-
! 
| Thomas Wilson
|  | Democratic-Republican
| 1813 
|  | Incumbent retired.New member elected.Democratic-Republican hold.
| nowrap | 

|}

Rhode Island 

Rhode Island elected its members August 27, 1816.

|-
! rowspan=2 | 
| John L. Boss Jr.
|  | Federalist
| 1814
| Incumbent re-elected.
| rowspan=2 nowrap | 

|-
| James B. Mason
|  | Federalist
| 1814
| Incumbent re-elected.

|}

South Carolina 

South Carolina elected its members October 14–15, 1816.

|-
! 
| Henry Middleton
|  | Democratic-Republican
| 1814
| Incumbent re-elected.
| nowrap | 

|-
! 
| William Lowndes
|  | Democratic-Republican
| 1810
| Incumbent re-elected.
| nowrap | 

|-
! 
| Benjamin Huger
|  | Federalist
| 17981804 1814
|  | Incumbent lost-relection.New member elected.Democratic-Republican gain
| nowrap | 

|-
! 
| John J. Chappell
|  | Democratic-Republican
| 1812
|  | Incumbent lost-relection.New member elected.Democratic-Republican hold.
| nowrap | 

|-
! 
| William Woodward
|  | Democratic-Republican
| 1814
|  | Incumbent lost-relection.New member elected.Democratic-Republican hold.
| nowrap | 

|-
! 
| John C. Calhoun
|  | Democratic-Republican
| 1810
| Incumbent re-elected.
| nowrap | 

|-
! 
| John Taylor
|  | Democratic-Republican
| 1814
|  | Incumbent lost-relection.New member elected.Democratic-Republican hold.
| nowrap | 

|-
! 
| Thomas Moore
|  | Democratic-Republican
| 18001812 1814
|  | Incumbent retired.New member elected.Democratic-Republican hold.
| nowrap | 

|-
! 
| William Mayrant
|  | Democratic-Republican
| 1814
|  | Incumbent lost re-election.New member elected.Democratic-Republican hold.Incumbent then resigned October 21, 1816, leading to a special election, won by the winner of the general election.
| nowrap | 

|}

Tennessee 

Tennessee elected its members August 7–8, 1817.

|-
! 
| Samuel Powell
|  | Democratic-Republican
| 1815
|  | Incumbent retired.New member elected.Democratic-Republican hold.
| nowrap | 

|-
! 
| William G. Blount
|  | Democratic-Republican
| 1815 
| Incumbent re-elected.
| nowrap | 

|-
! 
| Isaac Thomas
|  | Democratic-Republican
| 1815
|  | Incumbent retired.New member elected.Democratic-Republican hold.
| nowrap | 

|-
! 
| Bennett H. Henderson
|  | Democratic-Republican
| 1815
|  | Incumbent retired.New member elected.Democratic-Republican hold.
| nowrap | 

|-
! 
| Newton Cannon
|  | Democratic-Republican
| 1814 
|  | Incumbent lost-relection.New member elected.Democratic-Republican hold.
| nowrap | 

|-
! 
| James B. Reynolds
|  | Democratic-Republican
| 1815
|  | Incumbent lost-relection.New member elected.Democratic-Republican hold.
| nowrap | 

|}

Vermont 

Vermont elected its members September 3, 1816, replacing its six Federalists with six Democratic-Republicans.

|-
! rowspan=6 | 
| Daniel Chipman
|  | Federalist
| 1814
|  | Incumbent retired.New member elected.Democratic-Republican gain.
| rowspan=6 nowrap | 

|-
| Luther Jewett
|  | Federalist
| 1814
|  | Incumbent retired.New member elected.Democratic-Republican gain.

|-
| Chauncey Langdon
|  | Federalist
| 1814
|  | Incumbent lost-relection.New member elected.Democratic-Republican gain.

|-
| Asa Lyon
|  | Federalist
| 1814
|  | Incumbent lost-relection.New member elected.Democratic-Republican gain.

|-
| Charles Marsh
|  | Federalist
| 1814
|  | Incumbent retired.New member elected.Democratic-Republican gain.

|-
| John Noyes
|  | Federalist
| 1814
|  | Incumbent retired.New member elected.Democratic-Republican gain.

|}

Virginia 

Virginia elected its members in April 1817.

|-
! 
| John G. Jackson
|  | Democratic-Republican
| 18031810 1813
|  | Incumbent retired.New member elected.Federalist gain.
| nowrap | 

|-
! 
| Magnus Tate
|  | Federalist
| 1815
|  | Incumbent retired.New member elected.Federalist hold.
| nowrap | 

|-
! 
| Henry S. Tucker
|  | Democratic-Republican
| 1815
| Incumbent re-elected.
| nowrap | 

|-
! 
| William McCoy
|  | Democratic-Republican
| 1811
| Incumbent re-elected.
| nowrap | 

|-
! 
| James Breckinridge
|  | Federalist
| 1809
|  | Incumbent retired.New member elected.Democratic-Republican gain.
| nowrap | 

|-
! 
| Daniel Sheffey
|  | Federalist
| 1809
|  | Incumbent retired.New member elected.Democratic-Republican gain
| nowrap | 

|-
! 
| Ballard Smith
|  | Democratic-Republican
| 1815
| Incumbent re-elected.
| nowrap | 

|-
! 
| Joseph Lewis Jr.
|  | Federalist
| 1803
|  | Incumbent retired.New member elected.Federalist hold.
| nowrap | 

|-
! 
| John P. Hungerford
|  | Democratic-Republican
| 1813
|  | Incumbent lost-relection.New member elected.Democratic-Republican hold.
| nowrap | 

|-
! 
| Aylett Hawes
|  | Democratic-Republican
| 1811
|  | Incumbent retired.New member elected.Democratic-Republican hold.
| nowrap | 

|-
! 
| Philip P. Barbour
|  | Democratic-Republican
| 1814 
| Incumbent re-elected.
| nowrap | 

|-
! 
| William H. Roane
|  | Democratic-Republican
| 1815
|  | Incumbent lost-relection.New member elected.Democratic-Republican hold.
| nowrap | 

|-
! 
| Burwell Bassett
|  | Democratic-Republican
| 1815
| Incumbent re-elected.
| nowrap | 

|-
! 
| William A. Burwell
|  | Democratic-Republican
| 1813
| Incumbent re-elected.
| nowrap | 

|-
! 
| John Kerr
|  | Democratic-Republican
| 1815 
|  | Incumbent retired.New member elected.Democratic-Republican hold.
| nowrap | 

|-
! 
| John Randolph
|  | Democratic-Republican
| 17991813 1815
|  | Incumbent lost-relection.New member elected.Democratic-Republican hold.
| nowrap | 

|-
! 
| James Pleasants
|  | Democratic-Republican
| 1811
| Incumbent re-elected.
| nowrap | 

|-
! 
| Thomas M. Nelson
|  | Democratic-Republican
| 1816 
| Incumbent re-elected.
| nowrap | 

|-
! 
| Peterson Goodwyn
|  | Democratic-Republican
| 1803
| Incumbent re-elected.
| nowrap | 

|-
! 
| James Johnson
|  | Democratic-Republican
| 1813
| Incumbent re-elected.
| nowrap | 

|-
! 
| Thomas Newton Jr.
|  | Democratic-Republican
| 1797
| Incumbent re-elected.
| nowrap | 

|-
! 
| Hugh Nelson
|  | Democratic-Republican
| 1811
| Incumbent re-elected.
| nowrap | 

|-
! 
| John Tyler
|  | Democratic-Republican
| 1816 
| Incumbent re-elected.
| nowrap | 

|}

Non-voting delegates 

There were three territories with the right to send delegates during at least part of the 15th Congress.

Illinois Territory also only existed during the 1st Session, as it was admitted to the Union as the State of Illinois on December 3, 1818.

Mississippi Territory only existed during the first few months of the 15th Congress, but did not elect a delegate, since it was admitted to the Union as a state a few days into the 1st Session of the 15th Congress.

There were two elections held for the delegate from Missouri Territory. The first was contested by Rufus Easton on the grounds of electoral fraud. This election was declared void, and a second election was held on August 4, 1817. It was won without controversy by John Scott, who took his seat on December 8, 1817.

|-
! 
| Benjamin Stephenson
|  | Democratic-Republican
| 1814
| Incumbent retired.New delegate elected September 5, 1816.
| nowrap | 

|-
! 
| Rufus Easton
|  | None
| 1814
| Incumbent lost re-election.New delegate elected September 10, 1816 but challenged the result.Election was declared void January 13, 1817.
| nowrap | 

|}

See also 
 14th United States Congress
 15th United States Congress
 1816 United States elections
 List of United States House of Representatives elections (1789–1822)
 1816 United States presidential election
 1816–17 United States Senate elections

Notes

References

Bibliography

External links 
 Office of the Historian (Office of Art & Archives, Office of the Clerk, U.S. House of Representatives)